George Bridge may refer to:

People
 G.W. Bridge (George Washington Bridge) comics books character
 George Bridge (born 1995) New Zealand rugby union player

Facilities and Structures
 George Washington Bridge, bridge in New York City
 George Washington Bridge Bus Station
 George IV Bridge, Edinburgh, Scotland, UK; an elevated street
 George V Bridge (disambiguation) or King George V Bridge
 King George VI Bridge, Aberdeen, Scotland, UK; a bridge over the river Dee

See also
 
 George Bridges (disambiguation)
 George Brydges (disambiguation)
 George Street Bridge (disambiguation)
 George Street (disambiguation)
 George (disambiguation)
 Bridge (disambiguation)